Decathlon is a decathlon-themed sports game developed by C&E for the Nintendo Entertainment System, and published in 1992.

Gameplay 
The game offers two modes of play: "Single Game" and "Full Game". In Single Game mode, the player competes in one single event; in a Full Game, the player competes in all decathlon events in a preset sequence: 100 metres, long jump, shot put, high jump, 400 metres, 110 metres hurdles, discus throw, pole vault, javelin throw, and 1500 metres.
The game awards points based on player performance. In a full game, the player with the high score is the winner.

After choosing a mode of play, the player chooses a player character from a list of representatives from eight countries:

See also
Olympic Decathlon (1980)
The Activision Decathlon (1983)
Track & Field (1983)
Stadium Events (1986)
Olympic Gold (1992)

1992 video games
Nintendo Entertainment System games
Nintendo Entertainment System-only games
Summer Olympic video games
Video games developed in Taiwan
Athletics video games
C&E games